Věžky is a municipality and village in Přerov District in the Olomouc Region of the Czech Republic. It has about 200 inhabitants.

References

Villages in Přerov District